Poshekhonye is a town and the administrative center of Poshekhonsky District in Yaroslavl Oblast, Russia, located on the Sogozha River,  northwest of Yaroslavl, the administrative center of the oblast. Population: 

It was previously known as Pertoma (until 1777), Poshekhonye (until 1918), Poshekhonye-Volodarsk (until 1992).

History
It was founded as the village of Pertoma in the 17th century. In 1777, it was granted town status and renamed Poshekhonye. In 1918, the town was renamed Poshekhonye-Volodarsk, after V. Volodarsky. It bore that name until 1992, when it regained its old name of Poshekhonye.

Administrative and municipal status
Within the framework of administrative divisions, Poshekhonye serves as the administrative center of Poshekhonsky District. As an administrative division, it is incorporated within Poshekhonsky District as the town of district significance of Poshekhonye. As a municipal division, the town of district significance of Poshekhonye is incorporated within Poshekhonsky Municipal District as Poshekhonye Urban Settlement.

Economy
A popular variety of mass-produced cheese in Russia is called "Poshekhonsky". The original cheese factory in the city is currently no longer operating, although plans were made in 2007 to re-open it.

References

Notes

Sources

Cities and towns in Yaroslavl Oblast
Poshekhonsky District
Poshekhonsky Uyezd